Wediko Children's Services is a non-profit organization that provides therapeutic and educational services to children with serious emotional and behavioral problems and their families. It was founded in 1934.

Overview
Wediko provides residential treatment, consultation, school-based, and home-based therapeutic services to children and families struggling with complex psychiatric profiles and disruptive behavior. Wediko treats children with disorders that include, but are not limited to, depression, bipolar disorder, anxiety disorder, attention deficit hyperactivity disorder (ADHD), attention deficit disorder (ADD), reactive attachment disorder (RAD), post-traumatic stress disorder (PTSD), Asperger syndrome, and nonverbal learning disorder (NLVD).

History
Wediko is a therapeutic summer camp for children struggling with emotional, social, and behavioral disabilities. The Wediko Summer Program was started in 1934 by Dr. Robert A. Young. The initial goal was to provide a "fresh air" experience for children from the city whose behavior negated other summer options. For the next five years, the program ran at any site available for rental in Maine, New Hampshire, and Massachusetts. The program was suspended at the beginning of World War II and was reorganized in 1948. Wediko moved to the present  campus in Windsor, New Hampshire, in 1954. In 1980 Wediko established its School-Based Services working with students, teachers, and school personnel in schools in Boston and surrounding communities. In 1990 the Wediko School was started as a year-round residential program.

Programs

Wediko Summer Program
The Wediko Summer Program is a 45-day residential treatment program for boys and girls, ages 7 to 18, struggling with emotional, behavioral, and learning barriers. The Summer Program is located on a 450-acre waterfront campus in Windsor, New Hampshire.

School-based services
Wediko School-Based Services works with children, their families, and their schools in over 21 schools located in six cities. Wediko clinicians provide therapy (individual, family, and group) in schools and a small outpatient clinic. Collaborating with families, schools, and other service providers, clinicians can assist children in all the important contexts in their lives. Since 1997, Boston Public Schools have contracted with Wediko to run a therapeutic summer school program for special education students. Wediko also offers training seminars and workshops on topics such as positive behavior interventions and supports, trauma-sensitive schools, and whole-school improvement. In September 2011, Wediko expanded to New York City to provide school-based services to children and families in New York City public schools.

Wediko School
The Wediko School is a year-round residential program that provides therapeutic and educational services to the middle to high school-aged boys with complex psychiatric, behavioral, and learning issues. The Wediko School is located on the same campus as the Wediko Summer Program in Windsor, New Hampshire.

Publications
A varying range of publications, dissertations, and presentations have been based on studies at Wediko, reaching researchers in personality, developmental, and clinical psychology, as well as practitioners in school and mental health settings. Publications have been reprinted in the Year Book of Psychiatry and Applied Mental Health (2003), The Reference Guide to Counseling Children and Adolescents: Prevention, treatment, outcomes (2000), and American Psychological Association journals including the Journal of Consulting and Clinical Psychology, and the Journal of Personality and Social Psychology.

A central theme of the research is that children's behaviors, and more broadly their personalities, cannot be understood without attention to the interpersonal contexts in which they are embedded. Research at Wediko beginning in the late 1980s led investigators to advance a "contextual" model of traits that conceptualizes personality as patterns of "if...then" links between social contexts and children's responses to them.

References

Charities based in New Hampshire
Private high schools in New Hampshire
Private middle schools in New Hampshire
Boarding schools in New Hampshire
Therapeutic boarding schools in the United States